Tecnicolor would have been the fourth album by the Brazilian band Os Mutantes. The album was intended to be their introduction in the English-speaking world and included English versions of songs from the albums Os Mutantes and A Divina Comédia ou Ando Meio Desligado, re-recordings in Portuguese and French, and several new songs. It was recorded in Paris, in 1970, but release only 30 years later.

Speculations have been raised that the tapes were lost until writer Carlos Calado, working on the band's biography, uncovered them. An alternative explanation is that the band was unsatisfied with many of the recordings, and abandoned the project to return to Brazil. Three of the recordings from these sessions were used later that year in their album Jardim Elétrico.

The album was released in 2000 by Universal Records, with artwork by Sean Lennon, in order to capitalize on the growing interest in Os Mutantes following the re-release of their early albums in the late 1990s.

Track listing

Os Mutantes
 Arnaldo Baptista: vocals (tracks 1, 2, 4, 8, 9, 10, 12, 13), keyboards
 Rita Lee: vocals (tracks 1, 2, 4, 5, 6, 7, 8, 10, 11, 12, 13), percussion
 Sérgio Dias: vocals (tracks 1, 2, 3, 4, 5, 7, 8, 10, 12, 13), guitars
 Liminha: bass, backing vocal
 Dinho Leme: drums, percussion

1970 albums
Os Mutantes albums
Universal Records albums
Portuguese-language albums